Club Deportivo Santiagueño is a Salvadoran professional football club from Santiago de María, Usulután. The club currently plays at Tercera Division.

C.D. Santiagueño won the Salvadoran Premier Division title in the 1979–80 season.

History

1979–1980
After clinching fourth place in the regular league season, the club won the national title in the final round. In the final group round of four teams, Santiagueño beat Águila, FAS and Independiente Nacional 1906 to finish top of the group with five wins and only one defeat.

Subsequent years
The following season, in 1980–81, they clinched the regular season league title. In the finals, however, they fell short to Atlético Marte, losing 2–1 in the first leg, and 3–1 in the second leg. Both games were played in the Estadio Cuscatlán. Despite winning the title two years previous the team were relegated to Second Division in 1982.
They were relegated from the Third Division in 2007.

Honours
Santiagueno's first trophy was the TBD, which they won  in 1981. Their first league honour came in 1980–1981, when they won the 1980–81 Segunda División title

Once Lobos's honours include the following:

Domestic honours

Leagues
Primera División de Fútbol de El Salvador
 Champions (1): 1979-80
 Segunda División Salvadorean and predecessors 
 Champions: (1): 
 Tercera Division and predecessors 
 Champions: (1): 2022 Apertura

Current squad
Updated 18 December 2022.

Records

Club Records
 First Match (prior to creation of a league): vs. TBD (a club from TBD), Year
 First Match (official): vs. TBD, year
 Most points in La Primera: 00 points (00 win, 00 draws, 0 losses) Year/Year
 Least points in La Primera: 00 points (0 win, 0 draws, 00 losses) Year/year

Individual records
 Most capped player for El Salvador: 50 (0 whilst at Santiagueno), TBD
 Most international caps for El Salvador while a Santiagueno player: 1, TBD
 Most goals in a season, all competitions: unknown player, O (Year/year) (00 in League, 00 in Cup competitions)
 Most goals in a season, La Primera: TBD, 7

Santiagueño in International Competition
 1R = First Round

List of coaches
Argentina
  Raúl Miralles (1979)

Brazil
  Eraldo Correia (June 2021-2021)
  Eraldo Correia (January 2023-February 2023)

Chile
  Javier Mascaró

El Salvador
  Juan Antonio Merlos "Maquinita"
  Miguel Aguilar Obando (1996)
  Luis Alonso Santana "El Chispo"
  Ever Mejia (December 2021 - February 2022)
  Miguel Águilar Obando (June 2022- December 2022)

Guatemala
  Rafael Osorio (1980–1981)

Stadium
 Estadio Municipal de Santiago de María
 Estadio Leonidas Flores Cárdenas

References

External links
 Un recuerdo llamado Santiagueño – El Diario de Hoy 

Football clubs in El Salvador
1917 establishments in El Salvador
Association football clubs established in 1917